Mecistogaster pronoti is a species of damselfly in the family Pseudostigmatidae. It is endemic to Brazil.  Its natural habitat is subtropical or tropical moist lowland forests. It is considered as critically endangered and is threatened by habitat loss.

Sources

Fauna of Brazil
Pseudostigmatidae
Endemic fauna of Brazil
Insects described in 1918
Taxonomy articles created by Polbot
Taxobox binomials not recognized by IUCN